The 1999 Gravesham Borough Council election took place on 6 May 1999 to elect members of Gravesham Borough Council in Kent, England. The whole council was up for election and the Labour party stayed in overall control of the council.

Election result

References

1999 English local elections
1999
1990s in Kent